Umber Island is a rocky island, 2.4 km (1.5 miles) long, lying  southwest of Kamhi Point and 10 km (6 miles) northwest of Dint Island lying within Lazarev Bay, off the west side of Alexander Island, Antarctica. The island was mapped from air photos taken by the Ronne Antarctic Research Expedition (RARE) in 1947–48, by Searle of the Falkland Islands Dependencies Survey in 1960, it was so named by the United Kingdom Antarctic Place-Names Committee because on the RARE photos the island appears in deep shadow cast by the Havre Mountains to the north.

See also
 List of Antarctic and sub-Antarctic islands
 Dorsey Island
 Merger Island
 Stoltz Island

Islands of Alexander Island